Evocation of a Form: Human, Lunar, Spectral is an abstract bronze sculpture by Jean Arp. Modeled in 1950; it was cast in 1957.

It is in the Hirshhorn Museum and Sculpture Garden.

See also
 List of public art in Washington, D.C., Ward 2

References

1950 sculptures
Bronze sculptures in Washington, D.C.
Hirshhorn Museum and Sculpture Garden
Sculptures of the Smithsonian Institution
Outdoor sculptures in Washington, D.C.